Naam Shabana is a 2017 Indian Hindi-language action thriller film directed by Shivam Nair and written by Neeraj Pandey. The film is a prequel to the 2015 film Baby with Taapsee Pannu reprising her role as Shabana Khan. It also stars Manoj Bajpayee, Prithviraj Sukumaran, Anupam Kher, and Akshay Kumar returning in a special appearance. 

The film was dubbed into Telugu and Tamil languages and released on 31 March 2017. The Tamil title was Naanthan Shabana whereas the 
Telugu title was Nene Shabana. 

A day after its release in Pakistan, the film was banned there. The film received mixed reviews but was a box office success, benefitting from Kumar's presence.

Plot
The film shows the origin story of Shabana Khan, who works as a proficient field agent with Ajay Singh. It begins with two Indian agents working under Ranvir Singh chasing an international arms dealer named Mikhail. However, he kills them both and escapes.

A year later, Shabana, a college student who trains as a Kūdō fighter, falls under the agency's radar and starts being followed by them as a potential recruit. One of her friends, Jai, who is in love with her, asks her on a date and confesses his love for her. He asks her about her past, and she tells him that she had been kept in juvenile detention for killing her abusive father, who used to physically assault her mother. This event is what brought her to the agency's attention. During their bike ride home, Shabana is a victim of eve teasing from a group of four drunk men in a jeep, resulting in Jai getting killed and the assailants fleeing. The main assailant escapes justice after being identified as the son of an influential man.

Frustrated with the police, Shabana receives a call from an unknown number asking if she wants to avenge Jai's death. The caller, agent Ranvir Singh, agrees to help her take out the killer in exchange for Shabana joining a secret agency. Shabana agrees and receives information on the killer's whereabouts and the promised help that will aid her in killing them. She travels to Goa, where the killers are currently lying low. Keeping watch at a club, she is protected by another agent, who Ranvir tells her is their best. When she asks why they are helping her, Ranvir tells her she is indispensable to them, and since this is important to her, they will help her as best they can. She decides to kill only the main assailant, leaving the others to live in fear for their lives. After she kills the guy in his hotel room, Ajay Singh, who protected her at the club, helps her escape.

Following this, Shabana is recruited into the secret agency on a trial basis, where she receives extensive training in physical fitness and fighting techniques. The story then focuses on a global arms dealer and supplier, Mikhail. Three Indian agents track down Tony, Mikhail's right-hand man. Tony tips them off to a German doctor who has surgically changed Mikhail's face. By the time the agency contacts the doctor to find out how Mikhail looks, Tony kills all three agents and escapes, revealing that he is Mikhail. Ranvir discovers Mikhail is planning another plastic surgery to change his face.

Shabana is sent to kill him with Ajay and Omprakash Shukla's help this time. Shabana enters the operation theatre disguised as a patient and is about to kill Mikhail. To her surprise, he is awake as he had refused to take anesthesia during the operation. After a fight in which Mikhail almost strangles Shabana, she finally manages to kill him and escape from the police with Ajay's help.

Cast

Taapsee Pannu as Shabana Khan
Prithviraj Sukumaran as Tony Cake / Mikhail Warli
Rajesh Bhati as Mikhail (Before cosmetic surgery)
Manoj Bajpayee as Agent Ranvir Singh
Danny Denzongpa as Feroz Ali Khan
Virendra Saxena as Cableman, Ranvir's employee and Shabana's employer
Anupam Kher as Omprakash Shukla, Ajay's aide
Arjun Singh Shekhawat as Prashant
Akshay Kumar as Ajay Singh Rajput (special appearance)
Madhurima Tuli as Anjali Singh Rajput, Ajay's wife (special appearance)
Murali Sharma as Mr. Samir Gupta (special appearance)
Bhaskar B V as Srini, a RAW Agent
Zakhir Hussain as Aseem Gupta, a RAW agent
Bhuvan Arora as Karan Singh, Jai's murderer
Taher Shabbir as Jai Pal, Shabana's love interest (cameo appearance)
Natasha Rastogi as Farida Begum Khan, Shabana's mother
Manav Vij as Ravi Ahuja, a RAW agent
Mohan Kapoor as a college professor
Elli Avram as Sona, Tony's friend and Malik's girlfriend (cameo appearance)
Jagannath Nivangune as Police Inspector
Aparna Upadhyay as Mrs. Pal, Jai's mother
Divyangana Jain as Shabana's friend
Shibani Dandekar in a special appearance in the song "Baby Besharam"

Production

Development
Taapsee Pannu was trained in mixed martial arts for her role in the film. In October 2016, Prithviraj Sukumaran joined the cast of the film and shot for a cameo role. Akshay Kumar was signed to play a cameo in the film, reprising his role from the previous film. Anupam Kher was signed to play the role of a technical agent. French stuntman Cyril Raffaelli was signed to choreograph the stunts of the film. For the preparation of the role of Pannu's character as a spy, producer Neeraj Pandey took guidance from a full time consultant, an ex-intelligence officer.
Varun Dhawan was also rumoured to be a part of the film, however, the actor claimed later that he was not part of the film.

Filming
Principal photography of the film's first schedule began in September 2016 in Malaysia, where Kumar and Pannu shot for stunt sequences. Filming of the first schedule was completed in late October 2016. The film's second schedule was started in November 2016 in Mumbai. The shooting of the film was wrapped up in February 2017.

Music 
The songs of the film are composed by Rochak Kohli and Meet Bros. Lyrics are written by Manoj Muntashir and Kumaar and released by  T-Series. The film score is composed by Sanjoy Chowdhury.

Release
On April 9, 2017, the film was banned in Pakistan by its Central Board of Film Censors. It had been shown in Pakistan starting on March 31, 2017, as long as certain scenes with a terrorism theme were cut. One day after an Islamabad theatre showed an uncut version the film was banned from all theatres in the country.

Reception

Box office
The film was produced on a budget of 50 crores. Its first-day gross was approximately 32 crore, and the film finished its first weekend with an estimated gross of 70 crores. The film was declared a box office failure.

Critical response

Shubhra Gupta of The Indian Express wrote, "What does come as a surprise, however, is just how much of a drag the film is. Except for a few stray sequences in which the limber Taapsee Pannu goes after the bad guys, and the ones in which co-star Akshay Kumar moves in to demonstrate how the big boys do it, there is nothing either novel or interesting about the film."

See also

 List of films banned in Pakistan

Notes

References

External links
 
 
 
 

2017 films
2017 action thriller films
2010s Hindi-language films
Films set in Mumbai
Films shot in Mumbai
Film spin-offs
Indian action thriller films
Reliance Entertainment films
Films about the Research and Analysis Wing
Films set in Goa
Films scored by Sanjoy Chowdhury
Film controversies in Pakistan